Çlirim (Albanian for "liberation") is a village and a former municipality in the Korçë County, southeastern Albania. At the 2015 local government reform it became a subdivision of the municipality Kolonjë. The population at the 2011 census was 355.

Notable people 
Islam Radovicka, politician and military commander

References

Former municipalities in Korçë County
Administrative units of Kolonjë, Korçë
Villages in Korçë County